Eucithara tenebrosa is a small sea snail, a marine gastropod mollusk in the family Mangeliidae.

Kilburn (1992) listed this species as a  provisionally valid.

Description
The length of the shell attains 10 mm.

The shell is turreted, with narrowly, flatly shouldered whorls and deep sutures. It is distantly longitudinally ribbed, crossed by revolving striae. Its color is dark chestnut-brown without and within.

Distribution
This marine species occurs off the Philippines.

References

  Reeve, L.A. 1846. Monograph of the genus Mangelia. pls 1-8 in Reeve, L.A. (ed). Conchologia Iconica. London : L. Reeve & Co. Vol. 3.

External links
  Tucker, J.K. 2004 Catalog of recent and fossil turrids (Mollusca: Gastropoda). Zootaxa 682:1-1295

tenebrosa
Gastropods described in 1846